Cardamine nuttallii is a species of cardamine known by the common name Nuttall's toothwort. It is native to western North America from British Columbia to California, where it grows in moist mountain habitats.

Description
Cardamine nuttallii is a perennial herb growing from a small, white rhizome. It produces a thin, unbranching stem under 20 centimeters tall. The leaves are smooth or lobed along the edges and sometimes divided into a few smaller leaflets. The inflorescence bears generally more than one pale purple, pink, or occasionally white flowers with petals each over a centimeter long. The fruit is a silique up to 4 centimeters long.

Varieties
There are four varieties of this plant. The rare Cardamine nuttallii var. gemmata is endemic to the Sequoia sempervirens redwood forests of northern California and southern Oregon.

External links

Jepson Manual Treatment - Cardamine nuttallii
Cardamine nuttallii - USDA Plants Profile
Photo gallery: Cardamine nuttallii var. nuttallii

nuttallii
Flora of the West Coast of the United States
Flora of British Columbia
Flora of California
Flora without expected TNC conservation status